Brandon Smith may refer to:

Brandon Smith (politician) (born 1967), Republican member of the Kentucky State Senate
Brandon Smith (ice hockey) (born 1973), Canadian ice hockey player
Brandon Smith (defensive back, born 1984) (born 1984), Canadian football player
Brandon Smith (defensive back, born 1987) (born 1987), American football cornerback
Brandon Smith (linebacker) (born 2001), American football linebacker
Brandon Smith (rugby league) (born 1996), New Zealand rugby league player
Brandon Mychal Smith (born 1989), American actor
Brandon Smith,  Los Angeles based musician, producer and the creator of The Anix, former member of Apoptygma Berzerk

See also
Brendan Smith (disambiguation)